is a town located in Kuma District (also known as Kuma County), Kumamoto Prefecture, Japan. The town's name is the Japanese word for "brocade", and is used as a name for more than one town in Japan. The town can trace its origin back to the merger of three villages in 1884. Two more villages (Ichibu and Kijo) were merged with Nishiki, then known as Nishi-mura or "West village", in 1955. It formally gained its status as a town (町; chō or machi) on April 1, 1965. At one time, between 1985 and 2006, Nishiki was twinned with the (now defunct) town of Nishiki, Yamaguchi.

In April 2017, the town had an estimated population of 10,899 and a density of 140.26 persons per km2. Nishiki is served by the Higo-Nishinomura Station of the Kumagawa Railroad Yunomae Line.

Flag 
The current town flag was adopted in 1956, however there is no formal flag law codifying this.  The flag is green with a town emblem in the center. The emblem is a stylized katakana ニNi of Nishiki. The circle "symbolizes a reconciliation and the mountain, the river and the sun do the town located in the center of Kuma Basin which is expanding to the future".

Geography
Nishiki is located in the southern part of Kumamoto prefecture. 70 kilometers (43.5 miles) South-southeast of the town is the prefectural capital. The northern portion of the town lies in flat terrain that forms part of the Hitoyoshi Basin; the Kuma River borders the town to the East and West. The southern reaches of the Kuju mountain range (九重山, Kujūsan) adjoins one corner of the town limits. The southernmost corner of the townsland meets the prefectural border with Miyazaki Prefecture.

Economy 
The town's economy is primarily based around agriculture (primarily pear, peach and rice cultivation) and leisure tourism activities such as golf holidays, though the Nishiki plant of Renesas Semiconductor (formerly NEC Kumamoto) is also a major contributor. The Nishiki plant specializes in LSI manufacturing. The total economic output of Nishiki for fiscal year 2004 was ¥40.7 billion yen.

World War II 
During the closing years of the Second World War, a major base of the Imperial Japanese Navy's Hitoyoshi Naval Air Group was located near the town. Relatively little is currently known about the base and its operations due to a loss of records and institutional memory both during and after the war. In 2015, a full archeological survey of the site was initiated by the municipal government via the Nishiki board of education to discover more about the base and its past, with a view to eventually opening it up to tourism. This followed the discovery by the local government of a copy of a floor plan for the base.

See also 
Imperial Japanese Navy Air Service
Imperial Japanese Navy Aviation Bureau
Japanese Home Islands campaign
Hitoyoshi, Kumamoto
Torpedo bomber
Imperial Japanese Army Railways and Shipping Section

Notes

References

External links 

Nishiki official website 
熊本県の市町村旗一覧 (Municipality Flag List of Kumamoto Prefecture) Japanese Wikipedia 

Towns in Kumamoto Prefecture
1884 establishments in Japan
1965 establishments in Japan
Imperial Japanese Navy Air Service
Japan campaign
Archaeological sites in Japan
Contemporary archaeology
Tourism in Japan